John Shawe (born 1401-1431), also referred as John Shawe II, of Oxford, was an English politician. He was a Member of the Parliament of England (MP) for Oxford in April 1414.

References

14th-century births
1431 deaths
English MPs April 1414
People from Oxford